Sergei Uslamin (born 23 February 1963) is a Russian racing cyclist. He rode in the 1990 Tour de France.

References

1963 births
Living people
Russian male cyclists
Place of birth missing (living people)